Altus-Denning School District No. 31 was a school district in Arkansas, serving Altus and Denning. It operated one school, the Altus-Denning School.

The school building was in Altus; it was administratively divided between an elementary school and a high school.

On July 1, 2004, it consolidated into the Ozark School District.

References

Further reading
This includes a map of the district:
 (Download)

External links
 
 Altus-Denning School District No. 31  Franklin County, Arkansas  Regulatory Basis Financial Statements And Other Reports June 30, 2004 - Division of Legislative Audit, State of Arkansas

Defunct school districts in Arkansas
Education in Franklin County, Arkansas
2004 disestablishments in Arkansas
School districts disestablished in 2004